Uira can refer to

 UIRA, a project to create an open-source animation software
 Te Uira, a personification of lightning in Māori mythology.